is a Japanese drama series aired in Japan on Fuji TV in 2004.  It stars Takashi Sorimachi, Kyōko Hasegawa, Norito Yashima, and Ken Horiuchi.

Akira Kirishima, played by Takashi Sorimachi, is the most famous baseball player in Japan.  He is forced to retire early due to injuries.  His family abandons him and he decides to spend his time coaching at a local young boys baseball team.  The team is verging disbandment because they had not won one single game.

Takashi plays the popular baseball player who gives kids the hope that "dreams come true", but in reality he is arrogant and a selfish flirt who spends his money pointlessly.  Mizuki Isoyama, played by Kyōko Hasegawa, wants to become a lawyer.  Her brother plays on Kirishima's baseball team, but she can't stand Kirishima.

Cast
 Akira Kirishima - Takashi Sorimachi
 Mizuki Isayama - Kyōko Hasegawa
 Masayoshi Tsumasaka - Norito Yashima
 Osamu Okegawa - Ken Horiuchi
 Jiro Hayashi - Hiromasa Taguchi
 Nobuko Hayashi - Inuko Inuyama
 Isao Onoda - Toshifumi Muramatsu
 Sanae Onoda - Satoko Oshima
 Mika Shinoda - Miyoko Yoshimoto
 Touko Katsuragi - Yui Ichikawa
 Yukie Isayama - Mari Hamada
 Noboru Kaneko
 Megumi Oishi
 Takeshi Masu
 Shirō Itō
 Yasushi Isayama - Masahiko Nishimura
 Ikki Sawamura episodes 5, 8
 Guest - Yoko Moriguchi

Momonoki Jaguars
 Sho Isayama - Shouhei Kawaguchi
 Konsuke - Naruki Matsukawa
 Tomohiro Kumatani
 Junya Kawakita

References

External links
Wonderful Life JDorama page

Japanese drama television series
Television shows written by Yasushi Fukuda